The 2010–11 Süper Lig (known as the Spor Toto Süper Lig for sponsorship reasons) was the 53rd season since its establishment. The season began on 14 August 2010 and concluded on 22 May 2011.

Fenerbahçe claimed their 18th title, but the season was marred by the 2011 Turkish football match-fixing scandal which involved 17 Süper Lig teams and dozens of people, including club bosses and Turkish internationals.

Teams
Ankaraspor, Denizlispor and Diyarbakırspor were relegated at the end of the 2009–10 season after finishing in the bottom three places of the standings; Ankaraspor were automatically relegated by the Turkish Football Federation because of the election of Ahmet Gökçek, who was already a member of the board of Ankaraspor, as chairman of Ankaragücü.

The relegated teams were replaced by 2009–10 TFF First League champions Karabükspor, runners-up Bucaspor and promotion play-off winners Konyaspor. Karabükspor returned to the Süper Lig after an 11-year absence, while Bucaspor will make its debut in the Süper Lig after two successive promotions, becoming İzmir's first representation in the top-flight in seven years. Konyaspor made their immediate return to the Süper Lig after being relegated at the end of the 2008–09 season.

In further changes, Antalyaspor were renamed Medical Park Antalyaspor after accepting a sponsorship deal with Medical Park Hospitals Group on 20 July 2010.

Overview

Managerial changes

League table

Positions by round

Results

Top goalscorers
Including matches played on 15 May 2011; Source: Soccerway

Hat-tricks

References

External links
2010–11 Süper Lig at Soccerway

Süper Lig seasons
Turkey
1